An Irish Lullaby (or Suantraí: An Irish Lullaby) is the fourth studio album from Irish singer Pádraigín Ní Uallacháin. The album was released on the Shanachie Records label in the United States.

Track listing
"The Sleeping Lovers"
"Bí Im' Aice"
"The Willow Tree"
"The Gypsy Lullaby"
"Suantraí Sí"
"Suantraí Samhraidh"
"Eithne's Lullaby"
"As Darkness Follows Day"
"The Magical Band"
"Suantraí na Mná Sí"
"Mullach a' tSí"
"Still By Your Side"
"Suantraí Hiúdaí"
"Connemara Lullaby"
"Hó a Bhá-in"

Personnel 
Pádraigín Ní Uallacháin – Vocals, Composer
Máire Breatnach – Producer
Alan Whelan – Engineer

References

External links
 An Irish Lullaby - official website

1999 albums
Pádraigín Ní Uallacháin albums